WPNI (1430 AM) was an American radio station licensed by the Federal Communications Commission (FCC) to serve the community of Amherst, Massachusetts.

Ownership
In spring 2003, Pamal Broadcasting Ltd. (James Morrell, chairman/CEO) reached an agreement to acquire WPNI and WRNX from Western Massachusetts Radio Co., (Thomas G. Davis, president) for a reported sale price of $8 million. The broker for this transaction was Doug Ferber of Star Media Group, Inc. WRNX was later sold to Clear Channel Communications in 2006.

For a period of time after the purchase, WPNI was leased to the University of Massachusetts Amherst, owner of NPR member station WFCR, to provide an AM feed of the NPR News and Ideas channel.  The NPR programming was moved to Clear Channel's WNNZ on April 2, 2007 through a unique agreement where UMass programs the station, but Clear Channel retains ownership of the station and shares in the revenue stream generated by the station. (WNNZ was later sold to WFCR under the name "WFCR Foundation, Inc.")

Following the transition of the NPR programming to WNNZ, Pamal Broadcasting announced that WPNI was for sale and would temporarily carry the programming of WUMB-FM, a folk music non-profit radio station from the University of Massachusetts Boston.

In late September 2011, a tractor hit the guy wires of tower #1, causing it to collapse. WPNI filed for special temporary authority with the FCC to operate "non directionally" using the remaining tower for 180 days while the 2nd tower is replaced.

Pamal reached a deal to sell WPNI to Brian Dodge's The Love Radio Church on January 23, 2013. The sale was never completed, and was dismissed on June 25, 2014.

WPNI was taken off the air on November 30, 2013, as the station had no revenues to cover operational costs. After determining that resuming operations would not be viable, Pamal surrendered the station's license to the Federal Communications Commission on May 27, 2014.

References

External links

PNI
Mass media in Hampshire County, Massachusetts
Radio stations established in 1963
1963 establishments in Massachusetts
Radio stations disestablished in 2013
2013 disestablishments in Massachusetts
Defunct radio stations in the United States
PNI
Pamal Broadcasting